Dennis Buschening (born 2 March 1991) is a German-Thai professional footballer who as a forward.

Club career
Buschening learned to play football in the youth departments of Eintracht Frankfurt, Borussia Dortmund and Rot-Weiss Essen. He signed his first contract with Westfalia Rhynern, a club that played in the NRW-Liga. After 33 games, he moved to SC Verl in the Regionalliga in 2011 and then, from 2012 to 2013, to Hammer SpVg in Oberliga Westfalen. 

In 2013 he left Germany and moved to Thailand. Here he signed a contract with the first division side Buriram United from Buriram. After six months he was loaned to league rivals BEC Tero Sasana FC to Bangkok. After the end of his contract with Buriram, he joined Army United in 2014, a club that also played in the first division, the Thai League 1, and is based in Bangkok. He played four times for the Army. In 2015 he moved to Sattahip for the then first division team Navy FC. In 2017 he switched to the second division, the Thai League 2, where he joined Angthong FC. 

He returned to Germany in 2018 where he played again for Westfalia Rhynern. In the same year he joined the SpVgg Beckum, a club that played in the Oberliga Westfalen. 

For the back series in 2019 he went back to Thailand. Here he signed a contract in Chai Nat with Premier League club Chainat Hornbill FC. After Chainat's relegation to the second division, he left the club and moved to Malaysia. 

Here he signed a contract with Sabah FA. The club from Sabah became champions of the second division, the Malaysia Premier League, in 2019. In 2020 the club played in the first division, the Malaysia Super League. He was under contract with the club until the beginning of May 2021. He then moved to Shah Alam for league rivals UiTM FC.

Personal life
Buschening was born in Esslingen am Neckar to a Thai mother and German father.

Career statistics

Club

References

1991 births
Living people
People from Esslingen am Neckar
Sportspeople from Stuttgart (region)
German footballers
Footballers from Baden-Württemberg
Association football forwards
SC Verl players
Dennis Buschening
Dennis Buschening
Dennis Buschening
Dennis Buschening
Dennis Buschening
Hammer SpVg players
German expatriate footballers
Thai expatriate footballers
German expatriate sportspeople in Malaysia
Thai expatriate sportspeople in Malaysia
Expatriate footballers in Malaysia